Tilak Ram Sharma (born 8 June 1968) is a Nepali politician who has served as a member of the Lumbini Provincial Assembly since 2017. A member of the Communist Party of Nepal (Maoist Centre), he represents the Bardiya 1(B) constituency. Since 2021, Sharma has also been the provincial Minister of Internal Affairs and Communications.

Sharma was elected to the provincial assembly following the 2017 Nepalese provincial elections. He defeated Nepali Congress candidate Mangal Prasad Tharu, receiving 23,392 votes compared to Tharu's 20,841.

During his tenure as minister, Sharma has spoken in favor of LGBTI rights. In June 2022, Sharma served as the leader of a three-person government body formed to investigate provincial Minister of Health Bimala Kumari Khatri, who was accused of assaulting the wife and daughter of another politician.

References 

1968 births
Place of birth missing (living people)
Living people
21st-century Nepalese politicians
Members of the Provincial Assembly of Lumbini Province
Communist Party of Nepal (Maoist Centre) politicians